Grdica is a suburb situated in Kraljevo municipality in Serbia.

References

Populated places in Raška District